William Pitt the Younger led the government of the Kingdom of Great Britain from 1783 to 1801.

In 1800, the Acts of Union between Great Britain and Ireland were accepted by their respective parliaments, creating the new United Kingdom of Great Britain and Ireland (UK), which would be governed by the former Parliament of Great Britain (now the UK Parliament). Pitt governed this new state for the first month of its existence, until differences with King George III over Catholic emancipation caused him to resign.

Cabinet

Changes
March 1784The Duke of Rutland becomes Lord Lieutenant of Ireland, remaining also Lord Privy Seal.
December 1784Lord Gower (Lord Stafford from 1786) succeeds Rutland as Lord Privy Seal (Rutland remains Viceroy of Ireland).  Lord Camden succeeds Gower as Lord President.
November 1787Lord Buckingham succeeds Rutland as Lord Lieutenant of Ireland.
July 1788Lord Chatham, Pitt's elder brother, succeeds Lord Howe as First Lord of the Admiralty.
June 1789William Grenville (Lord Grenville from 1790) succeeds Lord Sydney as Home Secretary.
October 1789Lord Westmorland succeeds Buckingham as Lord Lieutenant of Ireland.
June 1791
Grenville succeeds the Duke of Leeds (Lord Carmarthen before 1789) as Foreign Secretary.
Henry Dundas succeeds Grenville as Home Secretary.
Lord Hawkesbury (from 1796 Earl of Liverpool), the President of the Board of Trade, joins the Cabinet.
June 1792Lord Thurlow resigns as Lord Chancellor.  The Great Seal goes into commission.
January 1793Lord Loughborough becomes Lord Chancellor.
July 1794
Lord Fitzwilliam succeeds Camden as Lord President.
Dundas takes the new Secretaryship of State for War, while the Duke of Portland succeeds him as Home Secretary.
Lord Spencer succeeds Stafford as Lord Privy Seal.
William Windham enters the Cabinet as Secretary at War.
December 1794
Chatham succeeds Spencer as Lord Privy Seal.
Spencer succeeds Chatham as First Lord of the Admiralty.
Fitzwilliam succeeds Westmorland as Viceroy of Ireland.
Lord Mansfield succeeds Fitzwilliam as Lord President.
February 1795Lord Cornwallis succeeds the Duke of Richmond as Master-General of the Ordnance.
March 1795Camden succeeds Fitzwilliam as Lord Lieutenant of Ireland.
September 1796Chatham succeeds Mansfield as Lord President. Chatham remains Lord Privy Seal.
February 1798Westmorland succeeds Chatham as Lord Privy Seal. Chatham remains Lord President.
June 1798Cornwallis succeeds Camden as Lord Lieutenant of Ireland, remaining also Master-General of the Ordnance.
February 1801Grenville, Spencer, and Windham resign from the Cabinet. The first two are succeeded by Lord Hawkesbury and Lord St Vincent, while Windham's successor is not in the Cabinet.

Notes

References

 
 
 

British ministries
1783 establishments in Great Britain
1801 disestablishments in the United Kingdom
1780s in Great Britain
1790s in Great Britain
1800s in the United Kingdom
Ministries of George III of the United Kingdom
Ministry 1
Cabinets disestablished in 1801